Michel Nischan is an American chef. A four-time James Beard Foundation Award winner, he is the cofounder and chairman of Wholesome Wave, Founder and President of Wholesome Wave, Co-Founder of the James Beard Foundation Chefs Boot Camp for Policy & Change along with Chefs Action Network, as well as Founder and Partner with actor Paul Newman of the former Dressing Room Restaurant.

Wholesome Wave
Wholesome Wave was founded in 2007 by Nischan, along with friends Michael Batterberry, and Gus Schumacher as founding Board Chair. It was founded with funding from Newman’s Own Foundation and the Betsy and Jesse Fink Foundation, and supported in part by funding from Grow for Good, a philanthropic initiative of FOOD & WINE Magazine. 
Until Dressing Room closed in 2014, Wholesome Wave and Dressing Room worked in tandem to create grassroots initiatives that celebrate local food systems, affordable food access in urban and rural communities struggling with poverty, and heritage recipe restoration.

Nischan wrote three cookbooks during his years as a chef known for local, organic, and sustainable well-being. Taste Pure and Simple (Chronicle Books 2003), a 2004 best-selling Beard award winner, Homegrown Pure and Simple (Chronicle Books 2005), and Sustainably Delicious (Rodale Publishing 2010).

Published works
Nischan wrote three cookbooks during his years as a chef known for local, organic, and sustainable wellbeing: Taste Pure and Simple (Chronicle Books 2003), a 2004 best-selling James Beard Award winner, Homegrown Pure and Simple (Chronicle Books 2005), and Sustainably Delicious (Rodale Publishing 2010).

Career and awards
Nischan’s book Taste Pure and Simple won a James Beard Foundation Award in 2004. Nischan won a second Beard Award in 2008 for his work on the PBS television series Victory Garden. His most recent award was presented by the James Beard Foundation in May 2015 for Humanitarian of the Year. He is also an Ashoka fellow. 
Nischan serves on the boards of the Amazon Conservation Team, the James Beard Foundation and Harvard’s Center for Health and the Global Environment. Below is a full list of his awards:

2017    Fast Company World Changing Ideas Award for Wholesome Wave Produce Prescriptions

2016    James Beard Foundation, Who's Who in Food and Beverage

2015    James Beard Foundation, Humanitarian of the Year

2015    Children of Bellevue, Honoree

2013    Food Inc. Awards, Pioneer Award

2013    Ira V. Hisckock Award for Public Health Service

2013    American Heart Association, Change the Future Award

2012    Monterey Bay Aquarium, Sustainable Chef of the Year

2012    Utne Reader Visionary Award

2012    California Small Farm Coalition Award for Excellence

2011    International Association of Culinary Professionals, Humanitarian
of the Year

2010    Hummingbird Environmental Citizen Award

2010    Chefs Collaborative, Pioneers Table Award

2010    Diabetes Research Institute, Dare to Dream Award

2010    Huffington Post, Top 100 Game Changer’s Award

2010    Lifetime Ashoka Fellowship Award

2008    Marine Stewardship Council, Sustainable Seafood Ambassador Award

2008    James Beard Foundation, Best Television Segment for PBS “Victory
Garden”

2007    Food Arts Magazine, Silver Spoon Award

2007    American Heart Association, Chef with Heart Award

2007    Condé Nast Traveler, Top 95 Restaurants in the World: Dressing Room Restaurant in Westport, CT and Pure Restaurant in Mumbai, India

2007    Esquire Asia, Top 10 New Restaurants in the World: Pure
Restaurant, Mumbai India

2004    James Beard Foundation, Best Health-Focused Cookbook

2004    Physician’s Committee for Responsible Medicine – Best Airline Food,           Song Airways Food for
Sale Program

1988    Marriott Hotels Corporation Chef of the Year

Philosophy
A son of displaced farmers, Nischan grew up watching American agriculture move in a direction antithetical to the environment on which it depends, and on the small and mid-sized family-owned business models that made American agriculture the envy of the world. Nischan’s deep appreciation for sustainable agriculture and those who work the land informs his work to this day. As a professional chef and advocate for a more healthful, organic, and sustainable food future, he has built on those childhood values and become a catalyst for change and new initiatives in local and regional food systems.

As the father of two sons living with diabetes, he holds a deep understanding of the struggles low-income families face in pursuing the healthy lifestyle choices that can help them prevent or manage this devastating disease. Nischan’s core belief is that everyone, regardless of race, ethnicity, age, or income, should have the resources they need to feed themselves and their families well.

References

External links 
 Wholesome Wave Wholesome Wave
 Michel Nischan Cooking And Food Blog |
 The James Beard Foundation Home | James Beard Foundation

Living people
American chefs
American male chefs
James Beard Foundation Award winners
Year of birth missing (living people)
Ashoka Fellows
Ashoka USA Fellows